Jacob Albert Young (born 14 July 1970) is a Norwegian jazz guitarist, arranger, composer, and band leader. He has recorded with Karin Krog, Arild Andersen, Larry Goldings, Nils Petter Molvær, Bendik Hofseth, Terje Gewelt, Per Oddvar Johansen, Arve Henriksen, Jarle Vespestad, Trygve Seim, Mats Eilertsen, Vigleik Storaas, Christian Wallumrød, Bendik Hofseth, Håkon Kornstad, Knut Reiersrud, and Audun Erlien.

Career
Young was educated at the University of Oslo and in New York. After graduation, he returned to Oslo in 1995, and released the album This is you (1995), with the musicians
Larry Goldings, Nils Petter Molvær, Bendik Hofseth, Terje Gewelt and Per Oddvar Johansen. The debut record was followed up by the album Pieces of time (1997), with the same lineup.

On the third solo album, Glow (2001), Arve Henriksen, Jarle Vespestad, Trygve Seim, Mats Eilertsen, Vigleik Storaas, Christian Wallumrød, Bendik Hofseth, Håkon Kornstad, Øyvind Brække, Knut Reiersrud, Audun Erlien and Reidar Skår contributed. The duo with Karin Krog resulted in the album Where flamingos fly (2002), assisted by bassist Arild Andersen.

His own band, Jacob Young Group, consisting of Mathias Eick (trumpet), Vidar Johansen (clarinet and saxophone), Mats Eilertsen (bass), and Jon Christensen (drums). They released the album, Evening falls (2004), and toured Europe. A derivation of J.Y. Group, the Jacob Young Trio with Eilertsen and Christensen, have toured Macedonia.

In 2003, he was awarded Gammleng-prisen.

Honors
Gammleng-prisen 2003 in the category Jazz

Discography

Solo albums 
 1995: This Is You (NorCD)
 1997: Pieces of Time (Curling Legs)
 2001: Glow (Curling Legs)
 2002: Evening Falls (ECM, 2002)
 2007: Sideways (ECM)
 2014: Forever Young (ECM)

With Siril Malmedal Hauge
 2017: Last Things (Oslo Session)

With Bendik Hofseth and Paolo Vinaccia
 2017: Rathkes Gate 12:21:58 (Oslo Session)

With InterStatic (Young/Powell/Vespestad)
 2011: Anthem (PVY)
 2012: InterStatic (RareNoise)
 2014: Arise (RareNoise)

With Karin Krog
 2002: Where Flamingos Fly (Grappa)

With David Rothenberg and Sidiki Camara
 2020: They Say Humans  Exist (Oslo Session)

Collaborations 
With Ivan Mazuze
 2015: Ubuntu (Losen)

With Nordic Circles
 2017: Under the Clouds (AMP)

With Sidiki Camara Group (André Viervoll, Audun Erlien, Bendik Hofseth)
 2015: Nakan (Wingman)

References

External links

Jacob Young at Groove.no

1970 births
Living people
Norwegian jazz guitarists
Norwegian jazz composers
Musicians from Lillehammer
ECM Records artists
NorCD artists
Grappa Music artists
Curling Legs artists
21st-century Norwegian guitarists
Losen Records artists
RareNoiseRecords artists